Power Slap, also known as Power Slap: Road to the Title, is a 2023 American television show originally broadcast by the TBS network, and currently on Rumble. Contestants on the show slap each other in the face in order to win the "Power Slap League" tournament. The show's first season consisted of 8 pre-recorded episodes and was followed by a live event that aired exclusively on Rumble.

The show is produced by Ultimate Fighting Championship (UFC) president Dana White. The show was due to premiere on January 11, 2023, but was delayed a week after White was filmed slapping his wife in a Mexican nightclub at a New Year's Eve party.

The show, considered the premiere program of the slap fighting combat sport, had significantly lower ratings than its professional wrestling lead-in programming, AEW Dynamite, consistently drawing around 250,000 viewers compared to Dynamites near million viewers. On 13 March 2023, Warner Media and TBS representatives confirmed to media sources that the network will no longer air Power Slap following the first season finale.

Rules
Power Slap, which has been licensed by the Nevada State Athletic Commission, uses rules similar to those established by other slap fighting leagues. After a coin toss to decide who goes first, the first striker has a time limit of 30 seconds to deliver an open-handed slap to the opponent. Slaps must be below the eye but above the chin, without leading with the palm such that all hand to face contact takes place at the same time. Those being slapped may not flinch, raise their shoulder or tuck in their chins. After being slapped, the slapped competitor then has 30 seconds to recover and get back into position before it's their turn to slap. Fights which don't end in a knock out and go three rounds go to the judges' decision, using a 10-point system with judging based on slap striker effectiveness as the slap receivers reaction and recovery time.

Fighters are seprated into diffrent weight and gender divisions similar to other combat sports.

Criticism and health risks
Upon initial airing, the show created controversy concerning the health of the participants and the inherent danger of the new sport. Neuroscientist, chronic traumatic encephalopathy researcher, and former professional wrestler Christopher Nowinski observed one of the show's participants displaying the fencing response after being struck, indicating serious brain injury. Greek neurologist Nikolas Evangelou called the show a "recipe for disaster" due to how "impact to the head, from an angle, can cause rotational forces on the brain", leading to "hopefully temporary, but sometimes permanent disruption to brain function" and "even more serious complications". Many combat sports athletes also responded negatively to the show. Boxer and WBC champion, Ryan Garcia, stated "Power slap is a horrible idea and it needs to be stopped." UFC fighter Sean O'Malley stated that he refused to watch Power Slap due to its association with brain injuries.

In response to the criticisms, show producers said, "We spend the money to make sure we have two healthy people in there, proper medical attention during and after the fight. These are the things we need to educate people on, just like we needed to educate people on mixed martial arts." In an interview before the show aired, White said "In Slap, they take three-to-five slaps per event. Fighters in boxing take 300-400 punches per fight. And guess what: you know what my answer to that [criticism of slap fighting] is? If you don't fucking like it, don't watch it! Nobody's asking you to watch this. Oh, you're disgusted by it? Watch The Voice."

On February 16, 2023, Bill Pascrell, a Congressman from New Jersey, and Don Bacon, a Congressman from Nebraska, announced that they were launching a Congressional inquiry into the ethicality of Power Slap. That same month, one of the world’s leading experts on chronic traumatic encephalopathy research, Dr. Bennet Omalu called for the show to be removed from television. Omalu stated "It is a very dumb [sport], very stupid and unsafe. It is primitive. To me, such a sport is inconsistent with the intelligence of humans. It is possible that a participant could die from this. Somebody could die or suffer catastrophic brain damage and become a vegetable. How can he [Dana White] make that statement? It is like saying you will make a loaded gun safe [...] Why is TBS showing such a primitive sport? It should not be on TV."

References

External links
 
 Power Slap on IMDb

2020s American television series
2020s American reality television series
American sports television series
TBS (American TV channel) original programming
2023 American television series debuts